Diisopropyl fluorophosphate (DFP) or Isoflurophate is an oily, colorless liquid with the chemical formula C6H14FO3P. It is used in medicine and as an organophosphorus insecticide. It is stable, but undergoes hydrolysis when subjected to moisture.

Uses in medicine
Diisopropyl fluorophosphate is a parasympathomimetic drug irreversible anti-cholinesterase and has been used in ophthalmology as a miotic agent in treatment of chronic glaucoma, as a miotic in veterinary medicine, and as an experimental agent in neuroscience because of its acetylcholinesterase inhibitory properties and ability to induce delayed peripheral neuropathy.

Uses as toxin

The marked toxicity of esters of monofluorophosphoric acid was discovered in 1932, when Willy Lange and his PhD student Gerda von Krueger prepared the methyl, ethyl, n-propyl, and n-butyl esters and incidentally experienced their toxic effects.  Another homologue of this series of esters, Diisopropyl fluorophosphate, was developed by British scientist Bernard Charles Saunders.  On his search for compounds to be used as chemical warfare agents, Saunders was inspired by the report by Lange and Krueger and decided to prepare the new homologue which he labeled PF-3.  It was much less effective as a chemical weapon than the G series agents.  It was often mixed with mustard gas, forming a more effective mixture with significantly lower melting point, resulting in an agent suitable for use in cold weather.  In military research, due to its physical and chemical similarities and comparatively low toxicity, it is used as a simulant of G-agents (GA, GB, GD, and GF).  Diisopropyl fluorophosphate is used in civilian laboratories to mimic lethal nerve gas exposure or organophosphate toxicities.  It has also been used to develop a rodent model of Gulf War Syndrome.

Diisopropyl fluorophosphate is a very potent neurotoxin.  Its  in rats is 6 mg/kg (oral).  It combines with the amino acid serine at the active site of the enzyme acetylcholinesterase, an enzyme that deactivates the neurotransmitter acetylcholine.  Neurotransmitters are needed to continue the passage of nerve impulses from one neuron to another across the synapse.  Once the impulse has been transmitted, acetylcholinesterase functions to deactivate the acetylcholine almost immediately by breaking it down.  If the enzyme is inhibited, acetylcholine accumulates and nerve impulses cannot be stopped, causing prolonged muscle contraction.  Paralysis occurs and death may result since the respiratory muscles are affected.

DFP also inhibits some proteases.  It is a useful additive for protein or cell isolation procedure.

Diisopropyl fluorophosphate (DFP)
Is a nerve gas developed by the German during the second world war . DFP irreversibly binds with the enzymes containing serine at the active site, e g. Serine proteases, acetylcholine esterase.

Production
Isoflurophate, the diisopropyl ester of fluorophosphoric acid, is made by reacting isopropyl alcohol with phosphorus trichloride, forming diisopropylphosphite, which is chlorinated and further reacted with sodium fluoride to replace the chlorine atom with fluorine, thus giving diisopropyl fluorophosphate.

Biochemistry
DIPF is a diagnostic test for the presence of the active site Ser in serine proteases.  The toxin, along with other neurotoxins is inactivated by the enzyme paraoxonase, which is present in widely varying levels in humans.

Society and culture
It is marketed under many brand names including Difluorophate, Diflupyl, Diflurphate, Dyflos, Dyphlos, Fluropryl, Fluostigmine, Neoglaucit.

See also 
MAFP (methoxy arachidonoylfluorophosphonate), a mechanistically related inhibitor
Neopentylene fluorophosphate, a cyclic analogue 
Sarin (isopropyl methylphosphonofluridate), a related phosphofluridate

References

Further reading

External links 
The MEROPS online database for peptidases and their inhibitors: DFP

Organophosphate insecticides
Acetylcholinesterase inhibitors
Phosphorofluoridates
Ophthalmology drugs
Neurotoxins
Isopropyl esters